A list of the active and inactive chapters of Chi Phi Fraternity.

Chapters 
These are the chapters of Chi Phi Fraternity. Active chapters are indicated in bold. Inactive chapters are shown in italic.  Dormant schools are also noted in italics, as are the predecessor branches of the fraternity which have merged into today's United Order.

As further explained in the main article, Chi Phi came from the following branches:
 The Chi Phi Society (1824–1825) 
 the Princeton Order (1854–1867)
 the Southern Order (1858–1874)
 the Hobart Order, or Secret Order (1860–1867)
 the Northern Order (1867–1874) combining the Princeton and Hobart groups.  
 and the United Order (1874) --the current Chi Phi Fraternity, after the merger of the Northern and Southern Orders.

These 'branch' names are referred to in the following table, by date of original establishment.

Notes

See also

 List of Chi Phi brothers

References

chapters
Lists of chapters of United States student societies by society